Bojan Jović (born 1 April 1982) is a Serbian football goalkeeper.

Club career
Born in Nova Pazova, Jović began playing football in the lower levels of Serbian football. He spent three seasons in Bosnian Premier League playing for FK Rudar Prijedor, FK Sloboda Tuzla before returning to Serbia to play with FK Javor Ivanjica. He only appeared in one Serbian SuperLiga match for Javor Ivanjica during his two seasons with the club. Afterwards, he played with FK Veternik before spending a half season again in Bosnian top league, this time with FK Sarajevo. He came to Romanian Liga I side FC Ceahlăul Piatra Neamț in summer 2011. After episodes with Borac Banja Luka, Rudar Kakanj and Zemun, Jović signed a one-year-and-a-half deal with Spartak Subotica.

References

External links
 
 
 

1982 births
Living people
Serbian footballers
Serbian expatriate footballers
Association football goalkeepers
FK BSK Borča players
FK Rudar Prijedor players
FK Sloboda Tuzla players
FK Veternik players
FK Javor Ivanjica players
FK Borac Banja Luka players
FK Zemun players
FK Spartak Subotica players
Serbian SuperLiga players
FK Sarajevo players
CSM Ceahlăul Piatra Neamț players
FK Bačka 1901 players
Liga I players
Expatriate footballers in Romania
Serbian expatriate sportspeople in Romania